The 2000 FIBA Europe Under-18 Championship was an international basketball  competition held in Croatia in 2000.

Final ranking

1. 

2. 

3. 

4. 

5. 

6. 

7. 

8. 

9. 

10. 

11. 

12.

Awards

External links
FIBA Archive

FIBA U18 European Championship
2000–01 in European basketball
2000–01 in Croatian basketball
International youth basketball competitions hosted by Croatia